Meredith Ellis (born September 9, 1941) is an American sprinter. She competed in the women's 200 metres at the 1956 Summer Olympics.

References

External links
 

1941 births
Living people
Athletes (track and field) at the 1956 Summer Olympics
American female sprinters
Olympic track and field athletes of the United States
Track and field athletes from New York City
Olympic female sprinters
20th-century American women